The station at Fleischmanns, New York, MP 44.1 of the Ulster and Delaware Railroad, was originally called Griffin's Corners station, as that was the town's original name. It was situated on a hill high above the busy town, and, like the town, was always very busy itself. Changes were made to the station when the New York Central purchased the line in 1932; a room was added on, and a chimney and a lookout room on the second floor were removed. The New York Central continued passenger service into the early 1950s, discontinuing it by early 1954. It survived even afterwards, but all that remains now is a freight house, which is used by the Delaware and Ulster Railroad.

References

External links
 Delaware and Ulster Railroad

Railway stations in the Catskill Mountains
Former Ulster and Delaware Railroad stations
Railway stations in Delaware County, New York
Former railway stations in New York (state)